The 2021–22 Port Vale F.C. season is the club's 110th season in the English Football League, and fifth consecutive season in EFL League Two.The season covers the period from 1 July 2021 to 30 June 2022. It is manager Darrell Clarke's first full season in charge of the club.

Clarke oversaw a complete overhaul of the playing squad, releasing 15 out of contract players and placing a further three contracted players on the transfer-list, whilst making 11 permanent signings and three loan signings. His new side got off to an indifferent start, winning one but losing just one of their opening five league games whilst exiting the EFL Cup in the first round. Three wins and one loss took them into the play-offs by the end of September and earned Clarke a Manager of the Month award. They took 13 out of a possible 18 points in October to establish themselves in second-place and win Clarke a second successive Manager of the Month award. However injuries to joint top-scorers Jamie Proctor and James Wilson took their toll the following month as Vale dropped to fifth and exited the EFL Trophy at the second round. Victories over League One sides Accrington Stanley and Burton Albion took Vale into the third round of the FA Cup.

Following an enforced five week break from the league, Vale's promotion push faltered with only four points gained from four January fixtures, whilst they were beaten by Premier League side Brentford in the FA Cup third round. The recruitment team were extremely busy, however, as eight players were signed and nine departed (including three loans cancelled early) in order to combat an ever worsening injury crisis. Despite Clarke entering a period of bereavement leave, with assistant manager Andy Crosby left in charge of first-team affairs, the team ended February on an eight match unbeaten run – though five of these games ended in draws. After a poor start to the month of March with one point gained from two games, Vale went on to gain 28 points from a possible 30 to leave themselves in third-place in mid-April. Three straight defeats saw them drop into the play-offs and Darrell Clarke returned to take charge for the final league game of the season. They defeated Swindon Town in the play-off semi-finals through a penalty shoot-out in dramatic circumstances. Promotion was secured at Wembley Stadium with a 3–0 victory over Mansfield Town in the final.

Overview

EFL League Two
Manager Darrell Clarke had to completely rebuild the playing squad after he released all 15 out of contract players following the club's mid-table finish at the end of the 2020–21 season: Shaun Brisley, Scott Brown, Ryan Campbell-Gordon, Adam Crookes, Mark Cullen, David Fitzpatrick, Kurtis Guthrie, Luke Joyce, Harry McKirdy, Zak Mills, Cristian Montaño, Tom Pope, Tom Scott, Daniel Trickett-Smith and Dino Visser. He also transfer-listed Theo Robinson, Danny Whitehead and Scott Burgess. Clarke's first signing as manager was Brad Walker, a defensive ball playing central midfielder who had been released from League One club Shrewsbury Town. He then paid Blackpool an undisclosed fee for central midfielder Ben Garrity, who he described as "young, hungry and ambitious". Biddulph-born James Wilson was then signed upon his release from Salford City, a 25-year old striker who had come through Manchester United as a highly rated teenager. The club also confirmed that Andy Crosby would be staying on at the club as assistant manager, which director of football David Flitcroft said was "a really important signing" due to his "outstanding coaching, organisational skills, knowledge, work ethic and enthusiasm". Aaron Martin, a 31-year old centre-back who had previously worked with Crosby at Southampton, then joined on a two-year deal. Another former Salford City player, left-back Dan Jones, then joined on a two-year deal. Taking Brown's place in goal was 30-year old Brazilian Lucas Covolan, who had been on the losing side of the National League play-off final despite scoring a stoppage-time equaliser for Torquay United. Aidan Stone, a 21-year old goalkeeper released from Mansfield Town, also joined the club. Defender Ryan Johnson was added after he rejected a contract from newly promoted Hartlepool United. Two more players were announced on 28 June: long-time Stevenage central midfielder Tom Pett and six-year Mansfield Town veteran full-back Mal Benning. The next arrival was 29-year old former Rotherham United striker Jamie Proctor, who signed a one-year deal. Lewis Cass, a 21-year old defender from Newcastle United then joined on a season-long loan.

Port Vale lost 1–0 in their opening day fixture away at Northampton Town and had Covolan sent off on his competitive debut. The first point was picked up seven days later in an entertaining goalless draw with Tranmere Rovers at Vale Park. Clarke then added Romanian wide midfielder Dennis Politic to the squad, who arrived on loan from Bolton Wanderers. Carlisle United visited Vale Park on 17 August and left with a point after another 0–0 draw. A third consecutive draw followed with a 1–1 stalemate at Stevenage, causing Clarke to condemn his side's "atrocious" first half performance. Vale achieved their first victory of the season with a 2–0 win a league leaders Forest Green Rovers, Proctor scoring both goals within the opening nine minutes. As the transfer window drew to a close, Clarke brought in striker George Lloyd on a season-long loan from Cheltenham Town. Meanwhile, Theo Robinson left the club to join divisional rivals Bradford City.

With Leon Legge out injured, Clarke signed free agent defender Danny Amos on a short-term deal to provide defensive cover. Proctor scored another brace at home to Rochdale, though defensive errors cost Vale a 3–2 defeat; captain Tom Conlon, returning from injury, said that "we started really well and then they have equalised and it has knocked the stuffing out of us". They picked up their second away win of the season at Swindon Town, with Garrity scoring both the side's goals in a 2–1 victory; after the game Clarke thanked the away support but urged critics to "not make scapegoats of any of our players". The first home win of the season came against Harrogate Town on 18 September, with David Worrall and James Wilson providing the goals that moved the Vale into the play-offs. A third straight win followed at struggling Scunthorpe United, where Garrity would score the game's only goal. Clarke was nominated for Manager of the Month and Garrity was nominated for Player of the Month; Clarke won the award, the second of his career.

Hosting second-placed Leyton Orient on 2 October, Port Vale took an early lead but went 2–1 behind on 86 minutes when Tom James – on the pitch despite having been reported as suspended for having received five yellow cards this season – scored a late goal; however substitute Politic scored an equalising stoppage-time goal on his long-awaited debut and Proctor then scored a winner two minutes later. The victory was marred however by racist abuse that had been sent over Instagram to opposition goalkeeper Lawrence Vigouroux by Port Vale supporters. The situation was reversed away at Sutton United as the Vale lost 4–3 despite leading 3–2 with four minutes of regular time remaining; Clarke was philosophical after the match, saying "you have to take your medicine. Last week we were joyous because we got injury-time goals, this week we are on the floor. But we will respond." They went one goal down at home to Barrow, but then responded with three second half goals to move back into third place. Vale took the lead against struggling Mansfield Town with a Conlon strike, but ended up drawing the game 1–1. On 23 October, the Vale eased to a 3–0 home win over Colchester United, with James Gibbons, James Wilson and substitute Aaron Martin sharing the goals. They found themselves a goal down at half-time at Crawley Town, but came back to win 4–1, with the home side reduced to ten men. Clarke won a second successive Manager of the Month award, becoming the first Port Vale boss to win the award two months running.

On 13 November, Vale played out a 1–1 draw with Bradford City in front of the SKY TV cameras at Vale Park as the Premier League and Championship were on an international break. However, with Proctor and now Wilson out with injuries, Vale's form stuttered with a 3–2 defeat at relegation threatened Oldham Athletic. Clarke's former club Walsall then eased to a 1–0 win at Vale Park, much to his chagrin as he stated that he was "embarrassed... [and] I won't accept that sort of performance – ever". Despite mounting injuries – including long-term absences for joint top-scorers Proctor and Wilson – they returned to winning ways with a 2–0 home victory over a poor Hartlepool United side.

Vale returned to the automatic promotion places with a 2–1 win at Clarke's former club Bristol Rovers on 7 December, with the undisciplined hosts going down to nine men after having two players sent off; the negative for Vale though was that Rodney hurt his ankle to leave all five of the club's forwards out injured. Without a recognised striker, Vale went to Newport County four days later and actually took the lead through makeshift striker Garrity, only to lose the game 2–1 with ten men after Jones was shown a late red card. This would prove the last match of the calendar year as three games were postponed over the Christmas holidays due to injury and illness – mainly thanks to the ongoing COVID-19 pandemic in England.

Clarke attempted to address the injury crisis in the forward roles by signing Ryan Edmondson on loan from Leeds United – who had spent the first half of the season on loan at Fleetwood Town – and Kian Harratt on loan from Huddersfield Town. Having failed to break into the first-team, Ryan Johnson was sold on to Stockport County for an undisclosed fee, whilst Danny Amos, Danny Whitehead and Scott Burgess were released. Chris Hussey, a 33-year old defender with 498 career appearances, was signed from Cheltenham Town for an undisclosed fee. The club then signed 28-year old defender Connor Hall from Harrogate Town for an undisclosed fee, whilst Leon Legge was allowed to move in the opposite direction. The club played their first home league fixture in seven weeks on 15 January, losing 3–1 to play-off rivals Swindon Town after Covolan was sent off on the stroke of half-time for kicking out at Harry McKirdy; a furious Clarke said that "he has got to learn from that otherwise he won’t be staying at the club for very long". A 1–0 defeat at home to Salford City made it five defeats in seven league games, though spectators felt Vale were the superior side, whilst the highlight of the game was a tractor being sent on to repair a goalpost after Hall collided with it and broke it. The run of defeats were ended with a dour goalless draw at Leyton Orient on 22 January, during which Clarke named only five substitutes due to injury and illnesses to first-team players. The recruitment team sprang into action by bringing in two loanees: winger Joel Cooper from Oxford United and  goalkeeper Tomáš Holý from Ipswich Town. Another new arrival was Harry Charsley, a 25-year old midfielder signed from Mansfield Town. However the injury crisis continued as Cass was ruled out of action for the rest of the season after tearing ankle ligaments in training. Devante Rodney left the club after being sold on to Walsall. Vale beat relegation threatened Scunthorpe United 1–0 on 29 January, Nathan Smith scoring the only goal of the game. The club made an eighth and final signing of the window by bringing in defender Sammy Robinson from Manchester City on a permanent transfer.

On 1 February, Vale earned a 1–1 home draw with league leaders Forest Green Rovers and could have won the game if it weren't for Rovers levelling the score with ten minutes left to play. A 3–1 win was achieved at struggling Carlisle, their first away win for two months. The unbeaten run was extended to five games following a 0–0 home draw with third-placed Northampton Town, though Clarke was highly critical of his side's performance. Another draw against an automatic promotion chasing team was achieved after Proctor's stoppage-time equaliser secured a 1–1 draw at Tranmere in a game Clarke was absent for due to a family bereavement. However three days later they were the victims of a stoppage-time equaliser as Rochdale won themselves a point with their only shot on target. With Clarke's absence continuing, Adam Murray was brought in to support acting manager Andy Crosby. They oversaw a 2–0 home win over Stevenage which took Vale to within three points of the play-offs, with Crosby saying "I couldn't be prouder of the players".

Vale opened March in much the same fashion as the previous month, drawing 1–1 with mid-table Harrogate Town. A dull 1–0 defeat at Colchester brought the unbeaten run to an end, with the hosts scoring the only goal of the game on 85 minutes. Garrity scored twice as Vale came from behind to beat Crawley 4–1 and reignite their play-off hopes. They again came from a goal down to beat Mansfield 3–1, with substitute Harratt claiming a brace. A third successive win came at Bradford City, with opposition manager Mark Hughes noting that "they have two strikers [Proctor and Wilson] who were good enough to retain possession and get people around them". The winning streak came to an end with a 0–0 draw at home to second-place Exeter City, with Crosby saying after the game that "I was trying to blow it over the line" as David Amoo had a last minute half-chance to win the game. They returned to the play-off places with a 2–0 home victory over Sutton United, a game notable for a scissor kick goal from Proctor. On 30 March, Clarke began a 'phased return' in support of Crosby, before taking full control again at the end of the season.

Port Vale came from behind to win 2–1 at Barrow and begin April in the automatic promotion places; after the match Crosby admitted that: "I don't think we were at the races in the first half. So, we came up with some solutions at half-time, let's say". A 1–0 win at Salford City, with Charsley scoring his first goal for the club, gave them a three-point gap between the automatic promotion places and the play-offs; opposition manager Gary Bowyer was full of praise for the "Valiants", hailing them as the best side his team had faced throughout the season. Relegation-threatened Oldham were the visitors on 9 April, and despite twice losing the lead from two first-half goals from Proctor, Vale won the 3–2 with a long-range strike from Walker. A Connor Hall goal on 67 minutes gave Vale a 1–0 win at Hartlepool, and after the match Clarke joined the team in celebrating in front of the away support. The winning run looked like being extended when Proctor scored in the second minute of the game with Bristol Rovers in front of 10,840 spectators at Vale Park; however the "Gas" equalised eight minutes later and went on to win the match 3–1. A poor performance and 2–0 defeat at nearby Walsall saw the Vale drop out of the automatic promotion places.

Port Vale needed to win their final two games to secure promotion, but instead fell to a 2–1 home defeat to mid-table Newport County on the May Day bank holiday; Crosby told his team to "shut out emotion" after their third consecutive defeat and to secure a play-off place away at Exeter on the last day of the season. Clarke completed a phased return to the manager role on 6 May. Vale won 1–0 at Exeter the following day with a James Wilson goal to book themselves a place in the play-offs and deny the hosts the league title. A fifth-place finish left them facing Swindon Town in the play-off semi-finals, and fans queued overnight to be included in the 2,200 ticket allocation for the first leg at the County Ground – the club's first play-off match in 29 years. McKirdy scored a brace to put Swindon 2–0 up, though Wilson pulled a goal back to keep the Vale in the tie and leave them facing just the one goal deficit to overcome at Vale Park. Wilson levelled the tie just eight minutes into the return fixture in front of 11,669 spectators at Vale Park, and despite it being an open game there were no further goals and the tie finished 2–2 on aggregate after extra-time; Port Vale won the resulting penalty shoot-out 6–5 to secure a place in the play-off final at Wembley Stadium. A pitch invasion ensued, during which Swindon Town manager Ben Garner said his players were "physically and verbally abused". An emotional Clarke remarked that "it typified our heart all season, the heart and desire" how his side recovered from missing two penalties before Swindon had missed any of theirs. He also issued an apology as he had been sent off for an altercation with Dion Conroy in extra-time, and went on to say that: "We've got one more game to go against Mansfield, which is fitting because it's where my eldest daughter came from.... it'll be an emotional day but I'm looking forward to the final.". The final proved to be a straightforward affair as Vale cruised to a 3–0 victory after going two goals up within 24 minutes and Mansfield having a man sent off on 35 minutes; Harratt and Wilson scored the first two goals, whilst former Mansfield veteran Benning made the game secure with a late third. Despite the game being largely decided by half-time, it was still a highly emotional occasion as Clarke dedicated the win to his daughter, Ellie Clarke, who died in February at the age of 18. David Amoo was the only player not retained at the end of the season. However, James Gibbons also left the club to join Bristol Rovers after rejecting Vale's offer of a new contract.

Finances
For a fifth successive season, the club kept season tickets at an "early bird price" of £310 in the Lorne Street and £295 in all other stands. Over 5,000 season tickets were sold.

Cup competitions
Port Vale were drawn at home to Accrington Stanley (League One) in the first round of the FA Cup. They belied their league status to cruise to a 5–1 victory after the away side were reduced to ten men on the 70-minute mark, with Wilson scoring a hat-trick and Cass and Lloyd scoring their first goals for the club. They were drawn away to League One side Burton Albion in the second round and seemed to have been beaten 1–0 when Politic scored an equalizing goal on 79 minutes and a winner just three minutes later. Their reward was a home tie with Premier League side Brentford in the third round. Brentford won the game 4–1, though Harratt's debut goal on the 70th-minute had given the Vale hope of coming back from 2–0 down, whilst Clarke was pleased with his side's performance considering they had not played a game in four weeks.

Vale were beaten 2–1 by Sunderland (League One) in the first round of the EFL Cup, though Clarke berated the referee for disallowing a Vale goal for a foul on the goalkeeper and stated that the decision to award Sunderland a penalty for a foul by Stone was also incorrect.

Vale were drawn into Northern Group D of the EFL Trophy alongside Bolton Wanderers (League One), Rochdale (League Two) and Liverpool U21. Seven changes were made way at Bolton Wanderers, and Vale came from a goal down to lead 2–1, only to lose the game 3–2. They went on to beat Rochdale 1–0 at home thanks to a stoppage-time winner, in a game which saw 17-year old Ellis Jones make his debut as a half-time substitute. Despite resting most of the first-team, Clarke's side cruised to a 5–0 victory over the Liverpool youth-team. They were drawn away to League One leaders Rotherham United in the second round, and held the "Millers" to a creditable 1–1 draw before they lost the penalty shoot-out 5–3.

Results

Pre-season

League Two

League table

Results summary

Results by matchday

Matches

Play-offs

FA Cup

EFL Cup

EFL Trophy

Squad statistics

Appearances and goals

Top scorers

Disciplinary record

Awards

Transfers

Transfers in

Transfers out

Loans in

Loans out

References

Port Vale
Port Vale F.C. seasons